Azalea is a populated place located within the city of Asheville, North Carolina in Buncombe County, North Carolina, United States.

Geography

Azalea is located at latitude 35.58 and longitude -82.471. The elevation is 2,051 feet.

Demographics

References

External links

Unincorporated communities in Buncombe County, North Carolina
Unincorporated communities in North Carolina